Pavlovci may refer to:

 Pavlovci, Serbia, a settlement in the Srem District in Vojvodina, Serbia
 Pavlovci, Slovenia, a settlement in the Ormož municipality in Slovenia
 Pavlovci, Požega-Slavonia County, a village near Brestovac, Croatia
 Pavlovci, Brod-Posavina County, a village near Nova Kapela, Croatia